Richard the Lionheart or similar names may refer to:

King Richard I of England
Riccardo Primo, opera by Handel, 1727
Richard the Lionheart (TV series), ITV production (1961–63)
Richard Coeur de Lion (play), 1876 semi-opera
Richard Coeur-de-lion (opera), French opera by André Grétry
Richard the Lion-Hearted (1923 film), starring Wallace Beery
Richard the Lionheart (2013 film), starring Gregory Chandler